HMS Tartarus was the mercantile Charles Jackson, launched in 1792 at Newcastle. She traded with Saint Petersburg until the British Royal Navy purchased her in 1797 and converted her to a bomb vessel. She served in two campaigns before she was lost in a gale on 20 December 1804.

Merchantman
Charles Jackson first appeared in Lloyd's Register (LR) in 1793.

Royal Navy
The Navy purchased Charles Jackson in April 1797 and had her fitted at Chatham between 28 April and 9 September for service as a bomb vessel. Commander Samuel Kempthorne commissioned HMS Tartarus in July. Commander Thomas Hand replaced Kempthorne in October.

In May 1798 Tartarus participated in Sir Home Riggs Popham's expedition to Ostend to destroy the sluice gates of the Ostend-Bruge Canal. The expedition landed 1,300 troops under Major General Coote. The army contingent blew up the locks and gates of the canal, but due to unfavourable winds preventing re-embarkation, Coote and the men under his command were then forced to surrender.

Tartarus participated in the navy's Egyptian campaign (8 March to 2 September 1801). Tartarus supported the Army's landing at Aboukir Bay (Battle of Abukir (1801)). , the schooner Malta and the cutter  protected the left flank. Consequently, her officers and crew qualified for the clasp "Egypt" to the  Naval General Service Medal (NGSM), which the Admiralty issued in 1847 to all surviving claimants.

Between June and August 1803 Tartarus underwent fitting at Woolwich. Commander Francis Temple commissioned her in July for the Downs. Commander Mauritius de Stark replaced Temple in 1804, and was himself replaced in June by Commander Thomas Withers.

Fate
A gale on 20 December 1804 wrecked Tartarus on Margate Sands. She had been at anchor to ride out the gale but drifted on to the sands when her cables parted. Two local fishing boats came out and rescued some sick men though one drowned when a boat overturned as they were being transferred. At low water she lay high and dry, but heeled over. At high water, the sea entered and all her remaining crew were taken off. She then disappeared beneath the sea with only the tops of her mast showing. The subsequent court martial admonished the officer of the watch for having gone below during his watch and advised him to be more careful in the future. It criticized the master's mate for inattention during his watch and ordered him to be reprimanded and to lose six months seniority.

Note

Citations

References
 
 

1792 ships
Ships built on the River Tyne
Age of Sail merchant ships of England
Bomb vessels of the Royal Navy
Maritime incidents in 1804